Liam John Barry (born 15 March 1971) is a New Zealand rugby union coach and former rugby union player. He is the assistant coach of New Zealand men's sevens team. He has previously been the assistant coach the Blues and head coach of North Harbour's provincial rugby union side. He debuted for North Harbour in 1991 at the age of 20, and racked up 83 games over a decade-long provincial career.  He had two spells in Japan, playing for NEC from 1997 to 2001 and Kubota from 2002 to 2004.

Barry holds a special place among the long parade of All Blacks for when he was chosen as a 22-year-old for the tour of Scotland and England in 1993 he followed:

 his father Kevin, All Black #623 and 
 his grandfather Ned, All Black #397;

in wearing the silver fern. That became the first instance of a family providing three generations of All Blacks. In July 2020 the family provided All Black jerseys worn by the three for display at the New Zealand Rugby Museum in Palmerston North.

Other relatives of note in rugby include:

 Patrick Barry, son of Edward who played for Counties, and
 Michael Barry, son of Kevin who played for North Auckland and  North Harbour.

Liam Barry is also a qualified teacher. He is married to Sarah and has four children.

International career
On his first tour with the All Blacks Liam Barry became the innocent participant in a major controversy. Coach Laurie Mains brought Mike Brewer into his squad for the latter part of the tour although he had been originally unavailable for business reasons and was in Britain at the time for that purpose. When Brewer was brought in as a reserve for the international against England and especially when he took the field as a replacement against the Barbarians in the tour finale it caused a storm of protest, especially in New Zealand. This was because he had been preferred to official selections in the team in Barry and also John Mitchell. The aftermath came close to Mains being replaced as All Black coach and, in fact, one of his selection colleagues, Peter Thorburn, was dropped for the 1994 season. 
Mains, apparently, believed Barry in 1993 had shown a lack of readiness for top international rugby and while he went on the development tour of Argentina in 1994 he was overlooked for the All Blacks for the next two seasons.

But at the end of the 1995 season Barry toured France and Italy and gained a test cap in the second international against France.  That was the end of his All Black career, though. He was affected by injury for much of the 1996 season and was ruled out of the tour of South Africa.

At the end of that year he took up a contract in Japan, returning to New Zealand for another NPC season with North Harbour in 2001. But after failing to win a Super 12 contract for 2002 Barry at 31 returned for another stint in Japan.

Coaching career
Barry had spent the six years with the Blues franchise, as a skills coach from 2006–2009 and assistant coach in 2009–10. 

In 2010 Barry had been named as the North Harbour rugby head coach for 2011 after former All Blacks Craig Dowd and Jeff Wilson who were sacked after two under-achieving seasons in the job. Unfortunately Liam was also unable to find success with the team as they recorded:

 2012 10 games – 1 win, 9 losses, 205 points for & 307 against – last place in the championship.
 2013 10 games – 1 win, 1 draw, 8 losses, 193 points for & 330 against – last place in the championship.
 2014 10 games – 3 wins, 7 losses, 214 points for & 306 against – 5th in the championship.

Although the 2014 season brought only 3 Albany wins these were notable as they were:
 29–24 over premiership semi-finalists Canterbury, 
 28–25 over the Ranfurly Shield holders Hawkes Bay, and 
 24–13 over Manawatu who were the championship winners in 2014.

Barry left the North Harbour coaching role at the end of the 2014 season to join Japanese club Ricoh Blackrams as an assistant coach. Barry then become the assistant coach of the New Zealand national rugby sevens team.

References

1971 births
Living people
People educated at Rosmini College
New Zealand rugby union players
New Zealand international rugby union players
North Harbour rugby union players
Rugby union flankers
Kubota Spears Funabashi Tokyo Bay players
Green Rockets Tokatsu players
New Zealand expatriate sportspeople in Japan
Expatriate rugby union players in Japan
New Zealand expatriate rugby union players
New Zealand rugby union coaches
New Zealand people of Irish descent
Rugby union players from Auckland
People from Takapuna